Kkochi is a category of Korean food cooked on skewers. The word kkochi means "skewer" in Korean.

Varieties

See also 
 Jeok

References 

Skewered foods
Street food in South Korea